is a platform arcade game released by Taito in 1984. The player guides Dami-chan, a superhero, through an apartment complex which is on fire. Armed with a fire extinguisher, Dami-chan must make his way down the levels avoiding gas explosions, crumbling floors, damaged lighting fixtures, and various enemies that pop out of the doors. The goal is to extinguish the fire and rescue Dami-chan's girlfriend, Nao-chan.

Various characters and gameplay elements from the game would go on to appear in later games made by Taito, particularly Bubble Bobble. The game would later appear on Taito Memories II Jōkan, and the game has since been ported to the Nintendo Switch and PlayStation 4 as part of the Arcade Archives.

Gameplay 
Ben Bero Beh is a platform arcade game. The player controls a superhero, Dami-chan, though a series of apartment complexes that are on fire in order to save his girlfriend, Nao-chan. To get though the flaming building, Dami-chan is armed with a fire extinguisher that can put out said fires, as well as manipulate stage hazards in order to get through them. Dami-chan can also jump to avoid fall damage from collapsed floors, enemies that appear from time to time out of the apartment doors, and various other hazards. The quicker the player completes the level, the more bonus points the player gets after completing a level.

Cameos of characters from various other Taito games also appear to try to halt Dami-chan's progress, such as the enemy spies from Elevator Action, and Chack'n from Chack'n Pop.

Release 
Ben Bero Beh was released by Taito in Japan in November 1984.

Conversions 
The game never received any home ports until the release of Taito Memories II Jōkan, which featured the game via emulation. On October 1, 2020, Hamster Corporation released a port of the game to Nintendo Switch and PlayStation 4 as part of their Arcade Archive initiative. This port features various display options, new gameplay modes, and an online leaderboard.

Reception and legacy 
Ben Bero Beh enjoyed success in Japanese arcades. Game Machine listed Ben Bero Beh on their November 15, 1984 issue as being the fourth most-successful table arcade unit of the month.

Notes

References

1984 video games
Arcade video games
Japan-exclusive video games
Nintendo Switch games
Platform games
PlayStation 4 games
Superhero video games
Video games about firefighting
Taito arcade games
Video games developed in Japan
Hamster Corporation games
Multiplayer and single-player video games